The 1994 NAIA Division I football season was the 39th season of college football sponsored by the NAIA, was the 25th season of play of the NAIA's top division for football.

The season was played from August to November 1994 and culminated in the 1994 NAIA Champion Bowl playoffs and the 1994 NAIA Champion Bowl, played this year on December 10, 1994 in Pine Bluff, Arkansas, on the campus of the University of Arkansas–Pine Bluff.

Northeastern State defeated Arkansas–Pine Bluff in the Champion Bowl, 13–12, to win their second NAIA national title and first since 1958.

Conference standings

Conference champions

Postseason

See also
 1994 NCAA Division I-A football season
 1994 NCAA Division I-AA football season
 1994 NCAA Division II football season
 1994 NCAA Division III football season

References

 
NAIA Football National Championship